The Missão Velha Formation is a late Jurassic geologic formation in northeastern Brazil's Araripe Basin where the states of Pernambuco, Piauí and Ceará come together. The formation is the middle stratigraphic unit of the Vale do Carirí Group, overlying the Brejo Santo Formation and overlain by the Abaiara Formation.

The formation comprises whitish fine-to-medium quartzose arenites, with subrounded to rounded grains, deposited in an alluvial fan environment during the syn-rift phase of the Araripe Basin.

The Missão Velha Formation has provided macrofossils of various genera of fish and reptiles as snakes, crocodylomorphs and turtles. Ichnofossils of dinosaurs were also discovered in the formation.

Geology

Fossil content 
The following fossils were reported from the formation:
 Fish
 Parvodus rugianus
 Planohybodus peterboroughensis
 Mawsonia cf. gigas
 Acrodus sp.
 Hybodus sp.
 Lepidotes sp.
 Neoceratodus sp.
 Polyacrodus sp.
 Vinctifer sp.
 Lonchidiidae indet.
 Reptiles
 Turtles
 Pelomedusidae indet.
 Dinosaurs
 Sauropoda indet.
 Theropoda indet.
 Loricata
 Mesosuchia indet.
 Snakes
 Lacertilia indet.
 Amphibians
 ?Amphibia indet.
 Ichnofossils
 Carnosauria indet.
 Ornithopoda indet.
 Dinosauria indet.

See also 
 Crato Formation
 Romualdo Formation

References

Bibliography 
Geology
 
 
 

Paleontology
 
 

Geologic formations of Brazil
Lower Cretaceous Series of South America
Cretaceous Brazil
Aptian Stage
Sandstone formations
Alluvial deposits
Ichnofossiliferous formations
Paleontology in Brazil
Environment of Ceará
Environment of Pernambuco
Environment of Piauí
Landforms of Ceará
Landforms of Pernambuco
Landforms of Piauí
Northeast Region, Brazil